Eythorne railway station is a station on the East Kent Railway. Originally a station on the East Kent Light Railway, It opened on 16 October 1916 but closed to passenger traffic after the last train on 30 October 1948. It served as the junction for the branch to Guilford Colliery, which was abandoned in 1921. The track on this branch was lifted in 1931 but relaid during World War II to accommodate a  rail mounted gun. The station served the village of Eythorne, it reopened as part of the East Kent Railway in 1993.

References 

 

Heritage railway stations in Kent
Former East Kent Light Railway stations
Railway stations in Great Britain opened in 1916
Railway stations in Great Britain closed in 1948
Railway stations in Great Britain opened in 1993